Peridaedala stenygra is a species of moth of the family Tortricidae first described by Józef Razowski in 2013. It is found on Seram Island in Indonesia. The habitat consists of secondary forests.

The wingspan is about 20 mm. The forewings are green with yellowish costal strigulae (fine streaks) and black divisions, as well as black markings. The hindwings are grey.

Etymology
The species name refers to the narrow median part of the sterigma and is derived from Greek stenygros (meaning narrow).

References

Moths described in 2013
Eucosmini